Pseudonoorda metalloma is a moth in the family Crambidae. It was described by Oswald Bertram Lower in 1903. It is found in Australia, where it has been recorded from Western Australia.

References

Moths described in 1903
Odontiinae